Saba Azad (born as Saba Singh Grewal, 1 November 1985) is an Indian actress, theatre director and musician. She is one half of Mumbai-based electro funk duo Madboy/Mink. She made her Bollywood debut as one of the leads Raaga in the indie film Dil Kabaddi (2008). She is known for her leading role in the romantic comedy film Mujhse Fraaandship Karoge (2011). She also played the role of Dingo in the 2016 Y-Films web series, Ladies Room.

Early life
Azad was born in Delhi to a Punjabi father and a Kashmiri mother. She is the niece of theatre great Safdar Hashmi. Born into a theatre family, Azad performed with Safdar Hashmi's theatre group Jana Natya Manch in their stage productions since a very young age, where she worked with Habib Tanvir, MK Raina, GP Deshpande and NK Sharma. She also trained in dance forms like Odissi, classical ballet, jazz, Latin as well as contemporary dance forms. Traveling with her Odissi guru, Kiran Segal, she performed in and outside the country including England, Canada and Nepal.

Her stint with cinema started after schooling when she landed a lead role in a short film Guroor for director Ishaan Nair which travelled to festivals in New York and Florence. She has since gone on to work in many short films.

Personal Life

As of 2022, she’s dating Hrithik Roshan.

Career

She made her Bollywood debut in 2008 with Anil Senior's Dil Kabaddi opposite Rahul Bose. She appeared in a leading role as Preity Sen in Y-Films Mujhse Fraaandship Karoge opposite newcomers Nishant Dahiya and Saqib Saleem.

Azad is a popular musician and singer in the Indian indie music scene and one half of widely popular electronic band Madboy/Mink which she started with actor and musician Imaad Shah in 2012.

Azad started her own theatre company The Skins in 2010 and directed her first play Lovepuke which opened at NCPA's experimental theatre in September 2010.

Azad moved to Mumbai from Delhi and acted in a two-man play directed by Makarand Deshpande staged at Prithvi Theatre.

She has featured in commercials for Cadbury, Pond's, Maggi, Tata Sky, Google, Kit Kat, Vodafone, Sunsilk, Nescafe, Airtel as well as print campaigns for Clean & Clear, Westside and Amway and many more.

Filmography

Film

Web series

Discography

References

External links

Living people
1990 births
Actresses from Delhi
Indian film actresses
Indian television actresses
Indian web series actresses
Actresses in Hindi cinema
Actresses in Hindi television
Women musicians from Delhi
Actresses from Mumbai
Bollywood playback singers
Indian theatre directors
Indian Sikhs
Punjabi people
21st-century Indian actresses
21st-century Indian women singers
21st-century Indian singers